The 2007–08 season was Kilmarnock's ninth consecutive season in the Scottish Premier League, having competed in it since its inauguration in 1998–99. Kilmarnock also competed in the Scottish Cup and the League Cup.

Summary

Season
Kilmarnock finished eleventh in the Scottish Premier League with 40 points. They reached the second round of the League Cup, losing to Hamilton Academical and the fifth round of the Scottish Cup, losing to Celtic.

Results and fixtures

Scottish Premier League

Scottish League Cup

Scottish Cup

Player statistics

|}

Final league table

Division summary

Transfers

Players in

Players out

References

External links
 Kilmarnock 2007–08 at Soccerbase.com (select relevant season from dropdown list)

Kilmarnock F.C. seasons
Kilmarnock